Ronell Joshua "Josh" Mance (born March 21, 1992) is an American sprinter who specialises in the 400 metres. He attends Florida State University in Tallahassee, Florida, where he has transferred after two years at the University of Southern California.

On June 24, 2012, he finished 4th in the 400 meters at the 2012 United States Olympic Trials, a result that won him a position on the United States Olympic team as a member of the 4x400 relay.  At the Olympics, Mance was part of the precarious American silver medal winning team.  In the semi-finals, Mance took the baton from Manteo Mitchell after Mitchell completed half a lap with what turned out to be a broken leg.  Mance helped pull the team back into position to qualify for the final.  In the final, the winning Bahamas team stacked their team, putting their best, Chris Brown in the lead leg.  Mance's second leg pulled the U.S. into contention while the two teams broke away from the field.  Mance handed to Tony McQuay who ran a spectacular 43.4 split to take the lead.  Mitchell's replacement, hurdler Angelo Taylor was out kicked in the last 50 meters by Ramon Miller to give Bahamas the win.

At the 2010 World Junior Championships in Athletics in Moncton, Canada, Mance won a gold medal over 4×400 metres relay. One year earlier, at the 2009 World Youth Championships in Athletics in Brixen, Italy, he received a silver medal over 400 metres, finishing second to future Olympic and World Champion Kirani James. In June 2010, he committed to the USC Trojans.

While at Don Antonio Lugo High School in Chino, California, Mance was a 2010 All-USA high school track and field selection by USA Today.  That year he won the CIF California State Meet championship in the 400 meters, and finished 4th in the 200.  In 2009, he finished second in the 400 meters to Reggie Wyatt, in the same meet Wyatt set the National High School Record in the 300 hurdles.

Personal best

References

External links

DyeStat profile for Josh Mance
Florida State Seminoles bio
USC Trojans bio
Personal website

1992 births
Living people
American male sprinters
Sportspeople from Pomona, California
USC Trojans men's track and field athletes
Athletes (track and field) at the 2012 Summer Olympics
Olympic silver medalists for the United States in track and field
Medalists at the 2012 Summer Olympics
Track and field athletes from California
World Athletics Championships winners